La Voivre may refer to:
La Voivre, Haute-Saône, a commune in the French region of Franche-Comté
La Voivre, Vosges, a commune in the French region of Lorraine